Great Coum is a hill in the Yorkshire Dales, but is located in the South Lakeland district of Cumbria. The highest point is in Dent parish, but the boundary with Casterton parish crosses the summit. Its neighbours include Crag Hill, Green Hill and Gragareth.

Great Coum is classified as a Marilyn, Hewitt, Nuttall, HuMP, Simm, 
Buxton & Lewis, Bridge and Clem.

References

Marilyns of England
Hewitts of England
Peaks of the Yorkshire Dales
Mountains and hills of Cumbria
Nuttalls
Dent, Cumbria